The women's 100 metres hurdles event at the 2002 Commonwealth Games was held on 29–31 July.

Medalists

Results

Heats
Qualification: First 3 of each heat (Q) and the next 2 fastest (q) qualified for the final.

Wind:Heat 1: +0.9 m/s, Heat 2: +0.8 m/s

Final
Wind: +0.6 m/s

References
Official results
Results at BBC

Hurdles
2002
2002 in women's athletics